A Heerhaufen, also Haufen or Haufe, was the name given to unorganised or poorly organised paramilitary troops and auxiliaries in Central Europe during the Early Modern Period. The term is German and is sometimes translated "company" or "troops".

The term Haufe was used especially during the peasants' wars and Thirty Years' War for a body of men, sometimes of several thousand armed peasants or  Landsknechten, often with as part of a grassroots democracy movement (c.f the Heeresversammlungs of antiquity), and therefore more loosely organised than the smaller and strictly military units known as Fähnleins.

The well known German Youth Movement song "Wir sind des Geyers schwarze Haufen" ("We are Geyer's black Haufen") recalls the notion of the Haufen.

The German name for a forlorn hope is Verlorener Haufen ("Lost Haufen").

See also 
 Verlorener Haufen
 Baltringer Haufen
 Schwarzer Haufen

Warfare of the Early Modern period
Warfare of the Middle Ages